"Crazy in the Night (Barking at Airplanes)" is a song by American singer-songwriter Kim Carnes and the lead single from her ninth studio album, Barking at Airplanes (1985). Written by Carnes, and co-produced with Bill Cuomo, the track is a pop rock song inspired by her eldest son's struggles with nightmares and fear of the dark as a child. It was released as a single in April 1985 by EMI America.

The song became one of Carnes' highest-charting singles, peaking at no. 15 on the Billboard Hot 100 and reaching the top 40 in various countries.

Lyrics and composition
Carnes was inspired to write "Crazy in the Night (Barking at Airplanes)" due to her son Collin's fear of the dark as a child. She incorporated the album's title, Barking at Airplanes, into the song title as a parenthesis. "I had a golden retriever [..] Every time the airplanes would go over, she’d bark at the airplanes. I thought, That’s such a cool, crazy title for an album."

Track listings
7-inch single
A. "Crazy in the Night (Barking at Airplanes)" – 3:35
B. "Oliver (Voice on the Radio)" – 3:46

12-inch single
A. "Crazy in the Night (Barking at Airplanes)" (dance mix) – 5:10
B. "Barking at Airplanes (Part II)" (dub mix) – 4:59

Credits and personnel

 Bill Cuomo – co-producer, synthesizers
 Craig Hull – background vocals
 Craig Krampf – drum programming, background vocals
 Daniel Moore – background vocals
 Dave Ellingson – background vocals
 David Egerton – second engineer
 Denny Densmore – second engineer
 Duane Seykora – additional second engineer
 Eric Blum – back cover photography
 George Marino – mastering at Sterling Sound (New York)
 Greg Gorman – cover photography
 Henry Marquez – art direction
 Judy Clapp – second engineer
 Kim Carnes – lead vocals, background vocals, co-producer
 Mark Ettel – recording engineer
 Matthew Rolston – inner sleeve photography
 Michael Brokaw (Kragen & Co.) – direction
 Mike Shipley – mixer
 Niko Bolas – additional engineer
 Richard Bosworth – additional second engineer
 Sabrina Bucharek – second engineer
 Steve MacMillan – second engineer
 Sue McGonigle – project coordinator
 Tony Chiappa – second engineer
 Vigon Seireeni – design
 Waddy Wachtel – electric guitar, background vocals

Charts

References

External links
 

1985 singles
1985 songs
EMI America Records singles
Kim Carnes songs
Songs written by Kim Carnes